Sainte-Hélène-Bondeville is a commune in the Seine-Maritime department in the Normandy region in northern France.

Geography

Population

Places of interest
 A priory from the sixteenth century at Alventot.
 Two old sandstone crosses.
 The church of St. Heléne, dating from the sixteenth century.
 The ruins of the church of St.Clair.

See also
Communes of the Seine-Maritime department

References

Communes of Seine-Maritime